Bakerton is an unincorporated community in Cumberland County, Kentucky, United States.  It lies near Route 704 northeast of the city of Burkesville, the county seat of Cumberland County.  Its elevation is 600 feet (183 m).

References

Unincorporated communities in Cumberland County, Kentucky
Unincorporated communities in Kentucky